Macacine betaherpesvirus 9 (McHV-9) is a species of virus in the genus Roseolovirus, subfamily Betaherpesvirinae, family Herpesviridae, and order Herpesvirales.

References 

Betaherpesvirinae